HERV-K_19q12 provirus ancestral Pol protein is a protein that in humans is encoded by the ERVK6 gene.

References

Further reading

Genes
Human proteins